Clara Voghan (born 1957, Buenos Aires) is the pen name of an Argentine writer of romance novels. She was a public accountant (U. C. A.) and married with three children. She began writing in 2001.
 
Her work, which she herself defines as "Literature to read in the metro", is composed of simple stories of sentimental nature, some of which are very short in length, while others are more extensive. Her novels immerse the reader in a world full of real characters, in an Argentina that is a pure magic realism.

She likes to think her novels could be catalogued as costumbrismo, disguised as romance, with constant bursts of humour. 
Her novels, widely distributed through the Internet, have conquered the hearts of readers in Spain, Latin America and the rest of the world.

Works 

In 2004, she initiated her digital publications with the romantic novel Un Saludo distinto (A Different Greeting), where the protagonists, Marcela and Damián, two neighbors, have never imagined that the real love could be hidden in the house of to the side. To this publication it followed two brief novels Renata (2005), whose main characteristic is that it is centred on the romantic adventures of a girl with overweight problems, and Soledad, sexo y pedagogía (Soledad, Sex and Pedagogy, 2006), where the daughter of a sexologist, filled with prejudices finds love alter a series of snarls. 
Towards the end of 2006, she announced a trilogy headed by the romantic novel Pequeños Pecados (Small Sins), where Victoria Ferrari's saga begins. Later, the collateral histories are completed by the publication of the novels Volver a empezar (Start Over Again, 2007) and A través de mis ojos (Through My Eyes, 2007). In 2008, she digitally published Elegir al Mentiroso (To Choose The Liar). Paula, her protagonist, has come to Buenos Aires with the intention of reporting the assassin of her husband; to achieve this she will only count with the help of her boss, a professional liar.

Literature 

 The history of Ifi (2008).
 Laura’s secret corner (2008).
 Delightfully vulnerable (2009).
 A disturbing proximity (2010).
 Of resentments and revenges (2015).

External links 
 Official Clara Voghan's web page 
 Clara Voghan's Fan's Group in Yahoo
 Blog Amores de Clara Voghan
 Amazon's Author page

1957 births
Date of birth missing (living people)
Living people
Writers from Buenos Aires
Argentine women novelists
Argentine romantic fiction writers
Women romantic fiction writers
21st-century Argentine novelists
21st-century Argentine women writers
21st-century Argentine writers